USS LST-960 was an  in the United States Navy. Like many of her class, she was not named and is properly referred to by her hull designation.

Construction
LST-960 was laid down on 11 October 1944, at Hingham, Massachusetts, by the Bethlehem-Hingham Shipyard; launched on 8 November 1944; and commissioned on 2 December 1944.

Service history
During World War II, LST-960 was assigned to the Asiatic-Pacific theater and participated in the assault and occupation of Okinawa Gunto in April and May 1945.

Following the war, she performed occupation duty in the Far East and saw service in China until early April 1946. She returned to the United States and was decommissioned on 2 July 1946, and struck from the Navy list on 15 August, that same year. On 4 April 1948, she was sold to Consolidated Builders, Inc., Seattle, Washington, for scrapping.

Awards
LST-960 earned one battle star for World War II service.

Notes

Citations

Bibliography 

Online resources

External links
 

 

LST-542-class tank landing ships
World War II amphibious warfare vessels of the United States
Ships built in Hingham, Massachusetts
1944 ships